Lucilla is the third studio album wrote by jazz musician Marco Di Meco, released on April 30, 2016, by Wide Sound Label.

Track listing

Musicians 

Per the liner notes
 Marco Di Meco — flute
 Andrea Conti — electric guitar 
 Fabiano Di Dio — piano, rhodes
 Emanuele Di Teodoro — electric bass 
 Andrea Ciaccio — drums

References

External links
 Discogs
 MusicBrainz

2016 albums